Şener Kurtulmuş (22 December 1967) is a Turkish former football goalkeeper. He achieved his biggest career successes at local side Beşiktaş, winning 1. Lig and Presidency Cup, both for once.

Honours
Beşiktaş
1. Lig (1): 1994–95
Presidency Cup (1): 1994

Personal life
In 1995, Rıza Çalımbay, Mehmet Özdilek, Sergen Yalçın, Alpay Özalan, Oktay Derelioğlu, Recep Çetin, Mustafa Özkan, Sertan Eser and, Şener Kurtulmuş took roles in a  popular music video of 90's local band Aykut—Hakan—Ayşe. Kurtulmuş married Aylin Yüksel in Cappadocia, Ürgüp, in 2007.

References
 General

 Video References

External links
 Profile at TFF 

1967 births
Turkish footballers
Süper Lig players
Beşiktaş J.K. footballers
Kasımpaşa S.K. footballers
Malatyaspor footballers
Living people
Association football goalkeepers